The 1926 St. Ignatius Gray Fog football team was an American football team that represented St. Ignatius College (later renamed the University of San Francisco) as an independent during the 1926 college football season. In its third season under head coach Jimmy Needles, the Gray Fog compiled a 2–3–3 record and was outscored by a total of 95 to 32.

Schedule

References

St. Ignatius
San Francisco Dons football seasons
St. Ignatius Gray Fog football